Tini Howard (born 1985) is an American comic book writer. She is best known for her work on X-Men titles, namely Excalibur as well as Boom Studio's Power Ranger titles. It was announced in mid-October 2021 that she'd be taking over Catwoman at DC Comics starting with issue #39.

Career
As a winner of the 2013 Top Cow Talent Hunt, Tini Howard's first comics credit was 2014's Magdalena: Seventh Sacrament. She then continued working with Top Cow Productions. She has since been a writer on comic book iterations of properties like Rick and Morty, Power Rangers and Barbie, as well as created comic books like Assassinistas and Euthanauts, which were published by IDW.

In 2019 at the C2E2 "Women of Marvel" panel, it was announced Howard had signed an exclusive contract with Marvel Comics. Since then, she's worked on the company writing Excalibur (as part of Dawn of X), Strikeforce, Death's Head, Thanos and Age of Conan: Belit.

Bibliography

Comics
IDW Publishing
 Assassinistas (collecting Assassinistas #1–6, illustrated by Gilbert Hernandez, trade paperback, 152 pages, 2018)
 Euthanauts: Ground Control (collecting Euthanauts #1–5, illustrated by Nick Robles, trade paperback, 136 pages, 2019)

Marvel Comics
 Age of Conan: Bêlit: Queen of the Black Coast (collecting Age of Conan: Bêlit (vol. 1) #1–5, illustrated by Kate Niemczyk, trade paperback, 112 pages, 2019) 
 Thanos: Zero Sanctuary (collecting Thanos (vol. 3) #1–6, illustrated by Ariel Olivetti, trade paperback, 144 pages, 2019)
 Death's Head: Clone Drive (collecting Death's Head #1–4, illustrated by Kei Zama, trade paperback, 112 pages, 2019)
 Strikeforce #1–9 (illustrated by Germán Peralta, Max Fiumara, Marika Cresta, Stacey Lee & Jacopo Camagni, September 2019–August 2020)
 Strikeforce - Volume 1: Trust Me (collecting Strikeforce #1–5, illustrated by Germán Peralta, Max Fiumara, Marika Cresta, Stacey Lee & Jacopo Camagni, trade paperback, 112 pages, 2020)
 Strikeforce - Volume 2: Fight Me (collecting Strikeforce #6-9 + The War of the Realms Strikeforce: The Dark Elf Realm #1, illustrated by Germán Peralta & Jacopo Camagni, trade paperback, 112 pages, 2020)
 Excalibur (vol. 4) #1–26 (illustrated by Marcus To & Wilton Santos, October 2019–January 2022)
 Excalibur by Tini Howard: Volume 1 (collecting Excalibur (vol. 4) #1–6, illustrated by Marcus To, trade paperback, 176 pages, 2020)
 Excalibur by Tini Howard: Volume 2 (collecting Excalibur (vol. 4) #7–11, illustrated by Marcus To & Wilton Santos, trade paperback, 112 pages, 2020)
 Excalibur by Tini Howard: Volume 3 (collecting Excalibur (vol. 4) #16-21, illustrated by Marcus To, trade paperback, 160 pages, 2021)
 Empyre: X-Men #1 (with Jonathan Hickman, illustrated by Matteo Buffagni, July 2020)
 Knights of X (2022–present)
 X of Swords: Creation #1 (with Jonathan Hickman, illustrated by Pepe Larraz, September 2020)
 X of Swords: Stasis #1 (with Jonathan Hickman, illustrated by Pepe Larraz and Mahmud Asrar, October 2020)
 X of Swords: Destruction #1 (with Jonathan Hickman, illustrated by Pepe Larraz, November 2020)

Oni Press
 Rick and Morty #33, #37–38, #41–42, #44–46, #50, #53–54 (December 2017–September 2019)
 Rick and Morty – Pocket Like You Stole It #1–5 (July–November 2017)
 Rick and Morty Presents – Unity #1 (#8 overall; November 2019)

References

Living people
American comics writers
Marvel Comics people
Marvel Comics writers
DC Comics people
1985 births